The anterior olfactory nucleus (AON; also called the anterior olfactory cortex) is a portion of the forebrain of vertebrates.

It is involved in olfaction
and has supposedly strong influence on other olfactory areas like the olfactory bulb and the piriform cortex.

Structure
The AON is found behind the olfactory bulb and in front of the piriform cortex (laterally) and olfactory tubercle (medially) in a region known as the olfactory peduncle or retrobulbar area. The peduncle contains the AON as well as two other much smaller regions, the taenia tecta (or dorsal hippocampal rudiment) and the dorsal peduncular cortex.

Function
The AON plays a pivotal but relatively poorly understood role in the processing of odor information.

Odors enter the nose (or olfactory rosette in fishes) and interact with the cilia of olfactory receptor neurons. The information is sent via the olfactory nerve (Cranial Nerve I) to the olfactory bulb.  After the processing in the bulb the signal is transmitted caudally via the axons of mitral and tufted cells in the lateral olfactory tract.  The tract forms on the ventrolateral surface of the brain and passes through the AON, continuing on to run the length of the piriform cortex, while synapsing in both regions.  The AON distributes the information to the contralateral olfactory bulb and piriform cortex as well as engaging in reciprocal interactions with the ipsilateral bulb and cortex.  Therefore, the AON is positioned to regulate information flow between nearly every region where odor information processing occurs.

Components
The AON is composed of two separate structures:
 a) a thin ring of cells encircling the rostral end of the olfactory peduncle known as “pars externa”,
 b) the large “pars principalis”, seen in coronal sections of most mammalian brains as a two-layered structure.
 The deepest (Layer II) is a thick ring of pyramidal and other-shaped cells surrounding the anterior limb of the anterior commissure.
 The outer, cell-poor layer, is often subdivided into a superficial zone (Layer Ia, which contains the output axons from the olfactory bulb) and a deeper area (Layer Ib).
 Many divide pars principalis on the basis of the ‘compass points,’ yielding pars dorsalis, pars ventralis, pars medialis, pars lateralis, and pars posterioralis (often combined with pars ventralis to form “pars ventroposterioralis”).

References

External links
 
 NIF Search - Anterior Olfactory Nucleus via the Neuroscience Information Framework

Olfactory system